DPIA may refer to:

 Data protection impact assessment, a kind of Privacy Impact Assessment, in the General Data Protection Regulation of the EU
 Docking planned incremental availability, in the United States Navy; for example see USS Abraham Lincoln (CVN-72)